The 1954 NASCAR Grand National season consisted of 37 races from February 1, 1954, and to November 1. Lee Petty, driving for Petty Enterprises,  won the championship, his first of three in the series.

Season recap 
The 1954 season consisted of 37 events from February 7 through October 24 of the year; opening in West Palm Beach, Florida, with a Herb Thomas victory, and concluding in North Wilkesboro, North Carolina, at the North Wilkesboro Speedway with a Hershel McGriff win.  While Thomas captured the opening event in a Hudson, the year was witness to the increased power of GM, Ford and Chrysler as Hudson slipped in its domination of the sport from previous years.  Petty came back to win the second race of the year at Daytona Beach, Florida, in his Chrysler.  Petty completed the season with 32 top-10 finishes of the 34 events that he competed in.  Through 1953, and up until the Southern 500 in 1954, Petty strung together a streak of 56 consecutive races where he was still running at the end of the race.

While Petty won fewer races (7) than Herb Thomas (12), his consistency in finishing in the top 10 a total of seven times more than Thomas proved to be the deciding factor in winning the championship with a 283-point margin.   Rising star Buck Baker captured the winner's purse a total of four times in 1954, and finished third after a 12th-place effort in 1953.  Although several of the top stars of the sport had disagreements, and even walked away from NASCAR for a time, the sport showed itself to be larger than any of the individual stars.  When Tim Flock was disqualified at Daytona, he quit the sport for a time.  Fonty Flock, Al Keller and Hershel McGriff also resigned at various times throughout the year. Also in  1954, drivers Petty, Thomas, Baker, Dick Rathman, McGriff, Keller, Jim Paschal, Curtis Turner, Gober Sosbee, John Soares, and Dan Letner all captured at least one victory during the year.

Season highlights 
Two-time champion Herb Thomas' season opening victory in February earned him $1,600, which included prize monies from both the Pure Oil Company and Champion Spark Plugs.  On February 20 Cotton Owens captured a modified-sportsman victory in an event that featured 136 starting entries; the largest ever starting field in a NASCAR event.  A day later, Tim Flock reached the checkered flag first, but was disqualified for using a two-way radio, and Lee Petty was awarded the victory.  It was the first time that radios were used in a NASCAR event, and Flock quit after the disqualification.

On February 20, 136 cars took the green flag at a 100-mile event in Daytona; making the event the largest ever starting field in a NASCAR sanctioned event.  The following day NASCAR ruled that Tim Flock was disqualified due to the use of a two-way radio.  On March 28 Dick Rathmann won a 125-mile race at Oakland Speedway after starting the event in last place.  The track was unusual in its configuration in that it consisted of dirt corners and paved straightaways.

On June 13, NASCAR held its first ever road course event, at the airport in Linden, New Jersey, with driver Al Keller coming away with the win in a Jaguar, as 20 of the 43 starting entries were foreign made vehicles.  The victory was the only win for a foreign-manufactured vehicle until Toyota captured its first victory at Atlanta Motor Speedway in March 2008 and as of the 2022 season, it is the only win scored by both Jaguar and a European manufacturer in the NASCAR Cup Series.

Race summaries

1954-01 
The first race of the season was run at Palm Beach Raceway in West Palm Beach, Florida. Dick Rathman won the pole.

Top 10 results 

92 - Herb Thomas
87 - Buck Baker
42 - Lee Petty
80 - Jim Paschal
24 - Ray Ruhigg
6 - Ralph Liguori
86 - Don Oldenberg
126 - Dave Terrell
82 - Joe Eubanks
181 - Tommie Elliott

1954-02 
The second race of the season was run at Beach & Road Course in Daytona Beach, Florida. Lee Petty won the pole.

Top ten results 

42 - Lee Petty
87 - Buck Baker
14 - Curtis Turner
3 - Dick Rathman
2 - Bill Blair
122 - Jack Smith
13 - Emory Lewis
25 - Fireball Roberts
51 - Gober Sosebee
77 - Stan Kross

1954-03 
The third race of the season was run at Speedway Park in Jacksonville, Florida. Curtis Turner won the pole.

Top ten results 

92 - Herb Thomas
14 - Fonty Flock
42 - Lee Petty
82 - Joe Eubanks
87 - Buck Baker
86 - Don Oldenberg
23 - Al Keller
181 - Tommie Elliott
6 - Ralph Liguori
4 - Tommy Moon

International 100
The 1954 International 100 was a NASCAR Grand National Series race that took place on June 13, 1954, on a temporary road course at Linden Airport in Linden, New Jersey. It was the first ever road course event in NASCAR competition. Buck Baker won the pole, with a speed of 80.536 miles per hour. Al Keller, racing a Jaguar XK120, won the race to score his second and final victory in the NASCAR Cup Series. It was the first race to be won by a foreign manufacturer car and as of 2022, it remains as the only win scored by Jaguar in NASCAR.

4 - Al Keller
82 -  Joe Eubanks
88 -  Buck Baker
2 - Bill Claren
32 - Bob Grossman
7-A - Harry LaVois
92 - Herb Thomas
3 - Dick Rathman
21 - Laird Bruner
42 - Lee Petty

Southern 500

The 1954 Southern 500 was a NASCAR Grand National Series race that took place on September 6, 1954, at Darlington Raceway in the American community of Darlington, South Carolina.

There were 364 laps done on a paved oval track that spanned . Van Van Wey made his NASCAR debut in this race; starting in 43rd place and ending in 20th place due to a crash on the 260th lap.

Overall, the race took five hours, sixteen minutes, and one second from the first green flag to the checkered flag. There were two cautions for four laps and the margin of victory was twenty-six seconds. Attendance of the race was confirmed at 28,000 people during the start of the race. Notable racers that appeared and did not finish in the top ten included Lee Petty (whose streak of 36 top-ten finishes ended at this race), Cotton Owens, Jimmie Lewallen, Ralph Liguori, Arden Mounts, Elmo Langley (in his NASCAR debut) and Buck Baker (pole winner).

92 - Herb Thomas
44 - Curtis Turner
98 - Marvin Panch
58 - Johnny Patterson
88 - Jim Paschal
40 - John Soares
25 - Fireball Roberts
7 - Gwyn Staley
13 - Joel Million
12 - Speedy Thompson

Mid-South 250

The 1954 Mid-South 250 was a NASCAR Grand National race that took place on October 10, 1954, at Memphis-Arkansas Speedway in the community of LeHi, Arkansas.

One hundred and sixty-seven laps were raced on a dirt track spanning . Twelve-thousand people attended this untelevised race where Buck Baker won in his 1954 Oldsmobile. Other notable competitors included Lee Petty (who led 150 laps which was considered to be the most laps), Marvin Panch, Jimmie Lewallen, Arden Mounts, and Junior Johnson.

87 - Buck Baker
3 - Dick Rathman
42 - Lee Petty
92 - Herb Thomas
4 - Herschel Buchanan
114 - Slick Smith
98 - Marvin Panch
189 - Lou Figaro
14 - Hershel McGriff
44 - Gober Sosebee

Final championship standings

References

 
NASCAR Cup Series seasons